Anastácia, a Mulher sem Destino is a Brazilian telenovela produced and broadcast by TV Globo. It premiered on 28 June 1967 and ended on 16 December 1967. It's the fourth "novela das oito" to be aired on the timeslot.

Cast 
The telenovela has more than 100 actors portraying different characters. Leila Diniz portrayed the protagonist, Anastácia. Other actors include Henrique Martins, Ênio Santos and Miriam Pires.

References 

TV Globo telenovelas
1967 telenovelas
1967 Brazilian television series endings
1967 Brazilian television series debuts
Brazilian telenovelas
Portuguese-language telenovelas